Juan Cardozo (born 1 August 1974) is a former Paraguayan footballer. Director Tecnico Club Sportivo Obrero Edelira km21 Campeón 2018

References

External links
 

1974 births
Living people
People from Encarnación, Paraguay
Paraguayan footballers
Paraguay international footballers
Club Atlético 3 de Febrero players
Cerro Porteño players
Sportivo Luqueño players
Club Nacional footballers
Club Olimpia footballers
Independiente F.B.C. footballers
Association football defenders